Sarathi, also called Kadali Jaya Sarathi, (26 June 1942 – 1 August 2022) was an Indian comedic actor and producer in the Telugu film industry. His most notable roles are in Manavuri Pandavulu, Bobilli Brahmanna, Driver Ramudu, Bakta Kannappa and Jaganmohini. Sarathi died from kidney ailments at a hospital in Hyderabad on 1 August 2022, at the age of 80.

Filmography

Velugu Needalu in 1961
Paramanandayya Sishyula Katha in 1966
Brahmachari in 1968
Sukha Dukhalu in 1968
Bhale Rangadu in 1969
Gandikota Rahasyam in 1969
Aggi Veerudu in 1969 as Fisherman
Collector Janaki in 1972
Bangaru Babu in 1973
Tatamma Kala in 1974
Manchi Manushulu in 1974
Bhakta Kannappa in 1976
Edureeta in 1977
Chiranjeevi Rambabu in 1977 as Singaram
Raja Ramesh in 1977
Chanakya Chandragupta in 1977 
Amara Deepam in 1977
Aalu Magalu in 1977
Jaganmohini in 1978
Mana Voori Pandavulu in 1978
Sommokadidhi Sokokadidhi in 1978
Driver Ramudu in 1979
Gandharva Kanya in 1979
Mosagadu in 1980
Gopala Rao Gari Ammayi in 1980
Kottapeta Rowdy in 1980
Mama Allulla Saval in 1980
Babulugaadi Debba in 1981
Taxi Driver in 1981
Guvvala Janta in 1981
Kaliyuga Ramudu in 1982
Madhura Swapnam in 1982
Pagabattina Simham in 1982
Jaggu in 1982
Dharma Poratam in 1983 as Dr. S. Apparao
Gudachari No.1 in 1983
Shakthi in 1983
Bobbili Brahmanna in 1984
Intiguttu in 1984
Sangeeta Samrat in 1984
Aggiraju in 1985
Gola Nagamma
Chattamtho Porattam in 1985
Jayam Manade in 1986
Simha Swapnam in 1989
Yamudannaki Mogudu in 1992
Hello Alludu in 1994 as Doctor

References

External links

1942 births
2022 deaths
Male actors in Telugu cinema
Indian male film actors
Telugu comedians
20th-century Indian male actors
Indian male comedians
People from West Godavari district
Deaths from kidney disease